The 2019 season was the Washington Redskins' 88th in the National Football League (NFL) and their sixth and final under head coach Jay Gruden, as well as their final season being known as the Redskins. The team retired the name and logo following the season after years of controversy regarding it. After five straight losses to open the season, their worst since 2001, the team fired Gruden and appointed offensive line coach Bill Callahan as interim head coach. The team finished 3–13, matching their worst 16-game record from the 1994 and 2013 seasons, which was the league's second-worst record that year, ahead of only the 2–14 Cincinnati Bengals.

The team's 3–13 record dropped the team to a combined record of 4–19 following Alex Smith's season-ending injury against the Houston Texans the previous season; Washington had entered that game at 6–3. Smith returned to the active roster in 2020. Following the season's end, team president Bruce Allen and several others within the team's front office were fired.

NFL Draft

Notes
 Washington traded their fourth-round selection to the Green Bay Packers in exchange for safety Ha Ha Clinton Dix, and forfeited their sixth-round selection after selecting cornerback Adonis Alexander in the 2018 supplemental draft.
 As the result of a negative differential of free agent signings and departures that Washington experienced during the  free agency period, the team was projected to receive three compensatory selections for the 2019 draft. Exact numbers of the selections from rounds 4–7 is to be determined when compensatory selections are awarded at the NFL's annual spring owners' meetings.
 Washington was awarded four compensatory picks including their second selections in rounds 3, 5 and 7 and their sole pick in round 6.
 Washington traded their second-round selection to the Indianapolis Colts in exchange for the 26th overall selection in the 2019 NFL Draft and a second round selection in the 2020 NFL Draft.
 Washington traded their third-round compensatory selection (pick 96) to the Buffalo Bills in exchange for picks 112 and 131 in the 2019 NFL Draft.

Staff

Final roster

Preseason

Regular season

Schedule

Note: Intra-division opponents are in bold text.

Game summaries

Week 1: at Philadelphia Eagles

Week 2: vs. Dallas Cowboys

Week 3: vs. Chicago Bears

Week 4: at New York Giants

Week 5: vs. New England Patriots

Week 6: at Miami Dolphins

Week 7: vs. San Francisco 49ers

Week 8: at Minnesota Vikings

Week 9: at Buffalo Bills

Week 11: vs. New York Jets

Week 12: vs. Detroit Lions

This was the only home victory of the season and final home victory as the "Redskins" because the name was retired in the wake of George Floyd protests.

Week 13: at Carolina Panthers

This would become the final victory as the "Redskins", as the name was retired in the wake of social unrest in 2020.

Week 14: at Green Bay Packers

The Redskins would fall to 3–10. This loss would eliminate the Redskins from playoff contention for the fourth consecutive season.

Week 15: vs. Philadelphia Eagles

Week 16: vs. New York Giants

The loss meant the Redskins were swept by the Giants for the first time since 2014. The loss also placed the Redskins last in the division for the first time since 2014.

Week 17: at Dallas Cowboys

Case Keenum returned to the starting role with Dwayne Haskins suffering an ankle injury the previous week. With the loss, the Redskins would tie their worst records of all time. This loss also ensured that they would get swept by all division rivals. This was their final game as the "Redskins" as the name was terminated several months later.

Standings

Division

Conference

See also
List of notable organizational conflicts in the NFL

References

External links
 

Washington
Washington Redskins seasons
Washington Redskins